The Potato Eaters is an oil painting by Dutch artist Vincent van Gogh painted in April 1885 in Nuenen, Netherlands. It is in the Van Gogh Museum in Amsterdam. The original oil sketch of the painting is at the Kröller-Müller Museum in Otterlo, and he also made lithographs of the image, which are held in collections including the Museum of Modern Art in New York City. The painting is considered to be one of Van Gogh's masterpieces.

Composition

During March and the beginning of April 1885 van Gogh sketched studies for the painting, and corresponded with his brother Theo, who was not impressed with his current work nor the sketches Van Gogh sent him in Paris. He worked on the painting from 13 April until the beginning of May, when it was mostly done except for minor changes that he made with a small brush later the same year.

Van Gogh said he wanted to depict peasants as they really were. He deliberately chose coarse and ugly models, thinking that they would be natural and unspoiled in his finished work.

Writing to his sister Willemina two years later in Paris, Van Gogh still considered The Potato Eaters his most successful painting: "What I think about my own work is that the painting of the peasants eating potatoes that I did in Nuenen is after all the best thing I did". However, the work was criticized by his friend Anthon van Rappard soon after it was painted. This was a blow to Van Gogh's confidence as an emerging artist, and he wrote back to his friend, "you...had no right to condemn my work in the way you did" (July 1885), and later, "I am always doing what I can't do yet in order to learn how to do it." (August 1885).

Vincent van Gogh is known to have admired the Belgian painter Charles de Groux and in particular his work The blessing before supper. De Groux' work is a solemn depiction of a peasant family saying grace before supper. The painting was closely linked to Christian representations of the Last Supper. Van Gogh's The Potato Eaters was inspired by this work of de Groux and similar religious connotations can be identified in van Gogh's work.

Versions

Lithograph

Van Gogh made a lithograph of the composition The Potato Eaters before embarking on the painting proper. He sent impressions to his brother and, in a letter to a friend, wrote that he made the lithograph from memory in the space of a day.

Van Gogh had first experimented with lithography in The Hague in 1882. Though he appreciated small scale graphic work and was an enthusiastic collector of English engravings he worked relatively little in graphic mediums. In a letter dated around 3 December 1882 he remarks

Influence of the Hague School
Van Gogh is often associated in people's minds with the Post-Impressionist movement, but in fact his artistic roots lay much closer to home in the artists of the Hague School such as Anton Mauve and Jozef Israëls.

In a letter to his brother Theo written mid-June 1884, Vincent remarks:

Before Vincent painted The Potato Eaters, Israëls had already treated the same subject in his A Peasant Family at the Table and, judging from a comment in a letter to Theo 11 March 1882, Vincent had seen this (or at least a variation of it) and had been inspired to produce his own version of it. Compositionally, the two are very similar: in both paintings the composition of the painting is centered by a figure whose back is turned to the viewer. 

As well as an interest gained by A Peasant Family at the Table, Vincent had an appreciation for a simpler lifestyle. Vincent was known to disregard the finer things, once writing in a letter to his brother Theo:

Van Gogh seemed to emotionally identify with the middle class, although he was from a family who were quite well-off. The subject was that of the harsh reality of life in the working class. He also simply admired the sustainability of the potato, or aardappel in Dutch. Aardappel literally translates to "earth apple," which paints an idea of a simpler, hearty lifestyle.

Theft
Thieves stole the early version of The Potato Eaters, the Weaver's Interior, and Dried Sunflowers from the Kröller-Müller Museum in December 1988. In April 1989, the thieves returned Weaver's Interior in an attempt to gain a $2.5 million ransom. The police recovered the other two on 14 July 1989; no ransom was paid.

On 14 April 1991, the Vincent van Gogh National Museum was robbed of twenty major paintings including the final version of The Potato Eaters. However, the getaway car suffered a blown tire, and the thieves were forced to flee, leaving the paintings behind. Thirty-five minutes after the robbery, the paintings were recovered.

See also
 List of works by Vincent van Gogh

References

Sources

Further reading

External links
Van Gogh, paintings and drawings: a special loan exhibition, a fully digitized exhibition catalog from The Metropolitan Museum of Art Libraries, which contains material on this painting (see index)
 The Potato Eaters (1885), oil on canvas, Van Gogh Museum, Amsterdam
 The Potato Eaters (1885), oil on canvas, Kröller-Müller Museum, Otterlo

Paintings by Vincent van Gogh
Paintings of the Netherlands by Vincent van Gogh
1885 paintings
Collections of the Van Gogh Museum
Food and drink paintings
Collections of the Kröller-Müller Museum
Stolen works of art